Rejsyty  is a village in the administrative district of Gmina Rychliki, within Elbląg County, Warmian-Masurian Voivodeship, in northern Poland.

The village has a population of 293.

References

Rejsyty